The Charlotte Research Institute (CRI) is a partnership between the University of North Carolina at Charlotte and corporations in the region.  The goal of CRI is to develop technology-based academic and business partnerships, ranging from consultation to onsite collaborative research.  The institute's support of education and research includes its three centers:  eBusiness, Optoelectronics and Optical Communications, and Precision Metrology.

The CRI is located on UNC Charlotte's Millennial Campus.

CRI Millennial Campus facilities

Academics

Bioinformatics Building
Duke Centennial Hall
Energy Production and Infrastructure Center (EPIC)
Grigg Hall
Kulwicki Motorsports Laboratory
Partnership, Outreach, and Research to Accelerate Learning (PORTAL)

Athletics

Robert and Mariam Hayes Stadium
Jerry Richardson Stadium

Photos

Research partners 
 University of North Carolina at Charlotte
 NC State University
 NC A&T
 Duke University
 Western Carolina University
 Clemson University
 Massachusetts Institute of Technology
 Oak Ridge National Laboratory
 Idaho National Engineering and Environmental Laboratory
 California Institute of Technology
 NASA Jet Propulsion Laboratory
 GE Research Lab
 University of Vermont School of Medicine
 Boeing Aerospace
 National Ignition Facility

External links
Charlotte Research Institute
PORTAL
EPIC
Guide to the Charlotte Biotechnology Conference and Five Ventures Business Innovation Competition Records 2005-2010

University of North Carolina at Charlotte
Research institutes in North Carolina
Organizations based in Charlotte, North Carolina